Pubnico may refer to the following places in Nova Scotia, Canada, all located on the shores of Pubnico Harbour:

Centre East Pubnico, Nova Scotia
East Pubnico, Nova Scotia
Lower East Pubnico, Nova Scotia
Lower West Pubnico, Nova Scotia
Middle East Pubnico, Nova Scotia
Middle West Pubnico, Nova Scotia
Pubnico (village), Nova Scotia
Upper West Pubnico, Nova Scotia
West Pubnico, Nova Scotia